(born May 22, 1992) is a Japanese singer. She is a former member of the J-pop idol group Berryz Kobo.

History
Tokunaga was born in Kanagawa, Japan. In 2002, she passed the Hello! Project Kids audition and became a member of Hello! Project.
She retired from the entertainment industry on February 28, 2021 and around the same timeframe she gave birth to a child.

Hello! Project groups and units 
 Hello! Project Kids
 ZYX
 H.P. All Stars (2004)
 Berryz Kobo (2004–present)
 Hello! Project Mobekimasu (2011)
  (2012–present)

Discography

Acts

Movies 
 Koinu Dan no Monogatari (December 14, 2002)
 Promise Land ~Clovers no Daibōken~ (July 17, 2004)
 Ōsama Game (December 17, 2011)

Radio 
 Berryz Kobo Kiritsu! Rei! Chakuseki! (March 30, 2005 – March 31, 2009)
 Berryz Kobo Beritsuu! (April 10, 2009 – current) (co-host Captain and Sudo Maasa)

Internet 
 12th Hello Pro Video Chat (Hello! Project on Flets) (June 3, 2005)

Solo photobooks 
 Chinami (September 11, 2009, Kadokawa Shoten)
  (October 12, 2012, Wani Books)

References

External links
 Official Hello! Project profile 

1992 births
Living people
Berryz Kobo members
Hello! Project Kids members
Japanese women pop singers
Japanese idols
Musicians from Kanagawa Prefecture
Japanese child singers
21st-century Japanese singers
21st-century Japanese actresses
21st-century Japanese women singers